Axtaçı-Qarabucaq (known as Qarabucaq until 2015) is a village and municipality in the Kurdamir District of Azerbaijan.

References

Populated places in Kurdamir District